The Journal of Vocational Behavior is a bimonthly peer-reviewed academic journal covering career development. It was established in 1971 and is published by Elsevier. The editor-in-chief is Nadya A. Fouad (University of Wisconsin-Milwaukee). According to the Journal Citation Reports, the journal has a 2021 impact factor of 12.082.

References

External links

Elsevier academic journals
Applied psychology journals
Publications established in 1971
Bimonthly journals
English-language journals